The 2010 Zolder Superleague Formula round was a Superleague Formula round  held on July 18, 2010, at Circuit Zolder, Heusden-Zolder, Belgium. It was the third year in a row that Superleague Formula visited the Zolder circuit, making it the only circuit to feature on the calendar every year until 2010. It was the sixth round of the 2010 Superleague Formula season.

Seventeen clubs took part including Belgian club R.S.C. Anderlecht. Olympique Lyonnais skipped the round after parting company with driver Sébastien Bourdais.

Support races included the Dutch Supercar Challenge, BOSS GP, Benelux Formula Ford and the Historic Youngtimers Special Open.

Report

Qualifying

Race 1

Race 2

Super Final

Results

Qualifying
 In each group, the top four qualify for the quarter-finals.

Group A

Group B

Knockout stages

Grid

Race 1

Race 2

Super Final

Standings after the round

References

External links
 Official results from the Superleague Formula website

Zoler
Superleague Formula
Circuit Zolder